Dominique Baert (born 24 October 1959) is a French politician who served as a member of the National Assembly, representing the Nord department. He is a member of the Socialist Party (Parti Socialiste) and works in association with the SRC parliamentary group.

In 2019, Baert publicly declared his support for incumbent President Emmanuel Macron.

References

1959 births
Living people
People from Tourcoing
Socialist Party (France) politicians
Mayors of places in Hauts-de-France
Lille University of Science and Technology alumni
Sciences Po alumni
Deputies of the 13th National Assembly of the French Fifth Republic
Deputies of the 14th National Assembly of the French Fifth Republic